Gagea filiformis is an Asian species of plants in the lily family, native to Russia (Altay Krai), China (Xinjiang), Kazakhstan, Kyrgyzstan, Tajikistan, Uzbekistan, Afghanistan, Pakistan, and Mongolia.

Gagea filiformis is a bulb-forming perennial up to 10 cm tall. Flowers are yellow or yellow-green.

References

External links
Pacific Bulb Society, Gagea photos of several species including Gagea filiformis
Plantarium, Gagea filiformis (Ledeb.) Kar. & Kir. Описание таксона in Russian with several color photos of Gagea filiformis

filiformis
Flora of Asia
Plants described in 1905